The Grenadian records in swimming are the fastest ever performances of swimmers from Grenada, which are recognised and ratified by the Grenada Amateur Swimming Association (GASA).

Long Course (50 m)

Men

Women

Short Course (25 m)

Men

Women

Short Course (25 yd)

Men

Women

References
General
Grenadian Long Course records – Men 13 December 2019 updated
Grenadian Long Course records – Women 23 July 2019 updated
Specific

External links
GASA web site

Grenada
Records